Orlović may refer to:

 Orlović clan, a Serb clan
 Fata Orlović, Bosnian refugee
 Marko Orlović, Serbian musician member of the band Kristali
 Milan Orlović (born 1989), Serbian rugby union player
 Miloje "Mića" Orlović, Serbian TV journalist, caster of several Eurovision Song Contests
 Nikolina Orlović, now known as Nikki Adler, Croatian-German boxer
 Pavle Orlović, semi-mythological Serbian medieval duke

See also
 Grgur Orlovčić, Croatian medieval military officer, captain of Senj with Petar Kružić

Serbian surnames